Rajesh Nandan is a social entrepreneur and serves as the senior vice president at the U.S. Fund for UNICEF.

Career 

Having joined UNICEF in 2009, Anandan serves as Senior Vice President of Private Sector Partnerships. In 2011, he launched UNICEF Ventures, a $400M portfolio fund for incubating businesses to accelerate innovation. He Founded ULTRA, a technology services company that includes ULTRA TESTING, a venture that employs individuals with autism.

Personal life
Originally from Sri Lanka, Anandan graduated from Massachusetts Institute of Technology in 1995 with a Bsc in Computer Science and Electrical Engineering.

References 

Living people
Sri Lankan businesspeople
UNICEF people
Sri Lankan people of Indian descent
Sri Lankan officials of the United Nations
Year of birth missing (living people)